The 129th (Wentworth) Battalion, CEF was a unit in the Canadian Expeditionary Force during the First World War.  Based in Dundas, Ontario, the unit began recruiting in late 1915 in Wentworth County.  After sailing to England in August 1916, the battalion was absorbed into the 123rd and 124th Battalions, CEF and the 12th Reserve Battalion in October 1916.  The 129th (Wentworth) Battalion, CEF had one Officer Commanding: Lieut-Col. W. E. S. Knowles.

The 129th Battalion was first perpetuated by The Wentworth Regiment and is now perpetuated by The Royal Hamilton Light Infantry (Wentworth Regiment).

References
 
Meek, John F. Over the Top! The Canadian Infantry in the First World War. Orangeville, Ont.: The Author, 1971.

Battalions of the Canadian Expeditionary Force
Royal Hamilton Light Infantry (Wentworth Regiment)